Hellinsia tinctidactylus is a moth of the family Pterophoridae. It is found in Australia.

External links
Australian Faunal Directory

Moths of Australia
tinctidactylus
Moths described in 1856